Khon Sawan is a district (amphoe) of Chaiyaphum province, northeastern Thailand.

History
Khon Sawan is an ancient city, in the past named Mueang Ka Long. It was built in same era as Mueang Khorat by Phraya Khun Han, a cousin of the governor of Khorat.

Geography
Neighboring districts are (from the north clockwise): Khok Pho Chai, Waeng Yai, and Waeng Noi of Khon Kaen province; Kaeng Sanam Nang of Nakhon Ratchasima province; and Mueang Chaiyaphum and Kaeng Khro of Chaiyaphum Province.

Administration
The district is divided into nine subdistricts (tambons).

Khon Sawan